Jalan Tanjung Sedili, Federal Route (formerly Johor state route J172), is a federal road in Johor, Malaysia. It is also a main route to Teluk Mahkota.  The Kilometre Zero of the Federal Route 212 starts at Tanjung Sedili.

Features

At most sections, the Federal Route 212 was built under the JKR R5 road standard, with a speed limit of 90 km/h.

List of junctions

References

Malaysian Federal Roads